Hacımusa can refer to:

 Hacımusa, Çorum
 Hacımusa, Gökçebey
 Hacımusa, Polatlı